Denzel Washington is an American actor who made his feature film debut in Carbon Copy (1981). In 1982, Washington made his first appearance in the medical drama St. Elsewhere as Dr. Philip Chandler. The role proved to be the breakthrough in his career. He starred as Private First Class Melvin Peterson in the drama A Soldier's Story (1984). The film was an adaptation of the Off-Broadway play A Soldier's Play (1981–1983) in which Washington had earlier portrayed the same character. In 1987, he played Steve Biko, an anti-apartheid activist in the Richard Attenborough-directed drama Cry Freedom, for which he received his first nomination for the Academy Award for Best Supporting Actor. Two years later, Washington won the award for playing Trip, a former slave-turned-soldier in Civil War film Glory (1989). In 1990, he played the title character in the play The Tragedy of Richard III, and starred in Spike Lee's comedy-drama Mo' Better Blues. Washington received the Silver Bear for Best Actor at the Berlin International Film Festival, for playing the eponymous civil rights activist in Lee's Malcolm X (1992).

In 1993, Washington starred in Kenneth Branagh's adaptation of the Shakespearean comedy Much Ado About Nothing, legal thriller The Pelican Brief with Julia Roberts, and AIDS drama Philadelphia with Tom Hanks. He appeared in Tony Scott's Crimson Tide in 1995. Washington won the Golden Globe Award for Best Actor – Motion Picture Drama, and his second Silver Bear for Best Actor for playing wrongly-convicted boxer Rubin Carter in the biographical film The Hurricane (1999). He followed this with another biographical role as American football coach Herman Boone in the 2000 sports drama Remember the Titans. For his next role as corrupt cop Alonzo Harris in the crime thriller Training Day (2001), Washington received the Academy Award for Best Actor. By virtue of his win, he became the first African American actor to win two competitive Academy Awards, and the first since Sidney Poitier in 1964 to win the leading actor award.

Washington reteamed with Scott on the thriller Man on Fire, and starred with Meryl Streep in The Manchurian Candidate (both in 2004). In 2005, he returned to the stage in the Shakespearean play Julius Caesar. Washington played drug kingpin Frank Lucas in American Gangster, and poet and educator Melvin B. Tolson in The Great Debaters (both in 2007). In 2010, Washington received the Tony Award for Best Actor in a Play for playing Troy Maxson in Fences (six years later, he starred in the film adaptation of the play for which he won the Screen Actors Guild Award for Outstanding Performance by a Male Actor in a Leading Role). For his portrayal of an alcoholic airline pilot in Flight (2012), he garnered an Academy Award nomination for Best Actor. In 2014, Washington appeared in the action thriller The Equalizer, and the play A Raisin in the Sun. He received further nominations for the Best Actor Oscar for Roman J. Israel, Esq. (2017) and The Tragedy of Macbeth (2021).

Film

Television

Theatre

See also
 List of awards and nominations received by Denzel Washington

References

External links
 

Male actor filmographies
American filmographies